Veprecula hedleyi is a species of sea snail, a marine gastropod mollusk in the family Raphitomidae.

Description
The length of the shell attains 3 mm.

This species differs from its congeners in its greater ventricosity and roundness of the whorl. The number of longitudinal ribs on the
body whorl is sixteen in the specimen figured. The spiral acute lirations are also more frequent than obtain in Veprecula sykesii or Veprecula vepratica. The four apical whorls are microscopically longitudinally costellate. The holotype possesses a greater number of ribs than obtained in the more recently collected examples, but the author cannot further separate them specifically.

Distribution
This species occurs in the Gulf of Oman and Réunion.

References

 Liu, J.Y. [Ruiyu] (ed.). (2008). Checklist of marine biota of China seas. China Science Press. 1267 pp.

External links
 Biolib.cz: image
 
 Gastropods.com: Veprecula hedleyi

hedleyi
Gastropods described in 1904